Ethel Ida Sanborn (1883–1952) was an American paleobotanist and professor of botany at Oregon State College and University of Oregon.  She published extensively on the flora of Oregon and the Western United States.

Works

References

1883 births
1952 deaths
American women scientists
American botanists
Paleobotanists